Foley Park is a suburb of Northern Maidstone.  Its closest village is Penenden Heath and is very close to the A249 and has easy access to the M20 motorway.  The area dates back to 1856 when the land was bought by a rich lord who named it Foley Park after its parkland appearance.  The land was bought back by the council and its population has grown from just 14 in 1935 to 357 now in 2007.

Borough of Maidstone